The 2022–23 Division 1 Féminine season, also known as D1 Arkema for sponsorship reasons, is the 49th edition of Division 1 Féminine since its establishment in 1974. The season began on 9 September 2022 and is scheduled to end on 10 June 2023. Lyon are the defending champions, having won their fifteenth league title in 2021–22 season.

Teams

A total of 12 teams compete in the league. Rodez and Le Havre replaced Issy and Saint-Étienne, who were relegated to Division 2 Féminine at the end of the last season.

League table

Results

Season statistics

Top scorers
As of 12 March 2023

Most assists
As of 12 March 2023

Most clean sheets
As of 12 March 2023

Hat-tricks

Awards

Player of the Month

References

External links
 FFF website 
  

Division 1 Féminine seasons
2022–23 domestic women's association football leagues
Division 1 Féminine